Griswold is a town in New London County, Connecticut, United States. The population was 11,402 at the 2020 census. Griswold contains the borough of Jewett City and the villages of Doaneville, Kaalmanville, Rixtown, Glasgo, Hopeville, Nathanieltown, and Pachaug.

History
Long a fishing ground for the Mohegan people, the waterways attracted settlers who established ironworks, saw and corn mills, and other businesses.

The town of Griswold was originally the northern part of the town of Preston. The North Society was established in 1716 at the request of residents who had been travelling to Preston to attend church.

In the late 1700s, Eliezer Jewett opened several mills and an irrigation plant. His success led the area to be called Jewett City. The town of Griswold incorporated in 1815, naming itself after Governor Roger Griswold. In 1895, Jewett City incorporated as a borough of the town.

Griswold contains Hopeville Pond State Park, former site of a woolen mill.

Geography
The Pachaug and Quinebaug rivers flow through the town of Griswold, which is located at the northeastern edge of New London County.

Demographics

As of the census of 2010, there were 11,951 people, 4,646 households, and 3,225 families living in the town. The racial makeup of the town was 91.6% White, 1.8% African American, 0.9% Native American, 2.2% Asian, 0.03% Pacific Islander, 0.6% some other race, and 2.8% from two or more races. Hispanic or Latino people of any race were 3.3% of the population.

There were 4,646 households, out of which 31.3% had children under the age of 18 living with them, 50.3% were headed by married couples living together, 12.5% had a female householder with no husband present, and 30.6% were non-families. 23.3% of all households were made up of individuals, and 7.4% were someone living alone who was 65 years of age or older.  The average household size was 2.57 and the average family size was 3.00.

In the town, the population was spread out, with 22.9% under the age of 18, 8.4% from 18 to 24, 27.2% from 25 to 44, 30.8% from 45 to 64, and 10.7% who were 65 years of age or older.  The median age was 39.6 years. For every 100 females, there were 99.8 males.  For every 100 females age 18 and over, there were 97.8 males.

At the 2000 census, the median income for a household in the town was $40,156, and the median income for a family was $48,852. Males had a median income of $57,869 versus $17,441 for females. The per capita income for the town was $21,196.  About 6.1% of families and 9.2% of the population were below the poverty line, including 6.1% of those under age 18 and 7.6% of those age 65 or over.

Notable locations

 Ashland Mill Bridge, a bridge over the Pachaug River built in 1886 and on the National Register of Historic Places since 1999
 Avery House, built in 1770, added to the National Register of Historic Places in 1986
 Edward Cogswell House, added to the National Register of Historic Places in 1993
 Kinne Cemetery, on Jarvis Road, in use since 1713 and added to the National Register of Historic Places in 2001
 Timothy Lester Farmstead, built in 1741 and added to the National Register of Historic Places in 1998
 Slater Library and Fanning Annex, 26 Main Street in Jewett City, built in 1884 and added to the National Register of Historic Places in 2002

Notable people

 Clifford Chapin (born 1988), voice actor affiliated with Funimation; born in Griswold
 John Cantius Garand (1888–1974), Canadian-American designer of firearms best known for creating the first successful semi-automatic rifle to be widely used in active military service, the M1 Garand; namesake of the Interstate 395 bridge that crosses the Quinebaug River on the Griswold/Lisbon town line
 Moses Coit Tyler (1835–1900), author; born in Griswold

References

External links 

Town of Griswold official website

 
Towns in New London County, Connecticut
Towns in Connecticut
1815 establishments in the United States